Treger may refer to:

Charles Treger, American violinist
A version of the name Tregeare, a hamlet in Cornwall, England
A Breton version of the name Trégor, Brittany, France (see Kernev, Leon and Treger)

See also
Träger (surname)
Trager
Pakn Treger